Elisabeth Leidinge (born 6 March 1957) is a Swedish former association football goalkeeper who won 112 caps for the Sweden women's national football team. She is nicknamed Lappen. Leidinge can be seen in the Sveriges Television documentary television series The Other Sport from 2013.

International career
Leidinge made her senior Sweden debut in the team's third ever match; a 1–0 defeat by Denmark in Finland on 27 July 1974. She won the first UEFA championships for national women's teams in 1984. Sweden beat England in the final, Leidinge saving twice in the penalty shootout at Kenilworth Road after a 1–1 aggregate draw. In 1991 Leidinge helped Sweden to a third-place finish at the inaugural FIFA Women's World Cup, where she was called one of the tournament's top keepers. The same year, she was given the Diamantbollen award for the best Swedish female footballer of the year. She retired after keeping goal for Sweden in the 1995 FIFA Women's World Cup, which they hosted.

References

External links

 Club Profile
 National Team Profile

Living people
1957 births
Swedish women's footballers
Sweden women's international footballers
FIFA Century Club
1991 FIFA Women's World Cup players
1995 FIFA Women's World Cup players
Damallsvenskan players
FC Rosengård players
Jitex BK players
People from Sundsvall
Women's association football goalkeepers
UEFA Women's Championship-winning players
Sportspeople from Västernorrland County